Charlemagne Anyamah (born 28 January 1938) is a French athlete who specialises in the men's decathlon. Anyamah competed at the 1968 Summer Olympics. He was born in Le Lamentin, Martinique.

References 
Charlemagne Anyamah's profile at Sports Reference.com

1938 births
Living people
People from Le Lamentin
French decathletes
Olympic athletes of France
French people of Martiniquais descent
Athletes (track and field) at the 1968 Summer Olympics